Chinese Paladin is a 2005 Chinese fantasy television series adapted from the popular Chinese adventure role-playing video game The Legend of Sword and Fairy by Softstar Entertainment. The series was produced by Tangren Media and Chinese Entertainment Shanghai and starred cast members from Mainland China, Taiwan, Hong Kong and Singapore. It was first broadcast in January 2005 on CTV and CBG in Taiwan and Mainland China respectively. The drama was hugely popular in China and achieved high ratings of 2.7.

Cast

 Hu Ge as Li Xiaoyao
 Liu Yifei as Zhao Ling'er
 Ady An as Lin Yueru
 Esther Liu as A'nu
 Eddie Peng as Tang Yu
 Bryan Wong as Liu Jinyuan
 Cheng Pei-pei as Granny Jiang
 Tse Kwan Ho as Jiu Jian Xian Wine Sword Immortal
 Elvis Tsui as Shi Jie Ren the Leader of Moon Worshiping Cult
 Zhou Dehua as Zhixiu
 Guo Liang as Jiang Jue Zhi, Sword Saint
 Ben Wong as Miao King
 Leslie Sun as Miao Queen
 Patrick Tam as Jiang Ming
 Jiang Xin as Nüyuan / Jiang Wan'er
 Jess Zhang as Caiyi
 Loletta Lee as Divine Lady
 Lynn Poh as Ji Sanniang
 Deng Limin as Shi Gonghu
 Yang Minna as Fox spirit
 Sam Lee as Wang Xiaohu
 Yang Kun as Li Daniang
 Joanne Tseng as Ding Xiulan
 Achel Chang as Ding Xianglan
 Wang Lei as Lady Nanman
 Jin Xin as Lin Tiannan
 Zhou Lan as Han Mengci

Soundtrack

Track listing
 Yongheng De Jiyi (永恆的記憶; Everlasting Memory)
 Zhongyu Mingbai (終於明白; Finally Understand) by Power Station
 Xiaoyao Tan (逍遙嘆; Sigh of Xiaoyao) by Hu Ge
 Shapolang (殺破狼; Kill the Broken Wolf) by JS
 Hua Yu Jian (花與劍; Flower and Sword) by JS
 Yizhi Hen Anjing (一直很安靜; Constant Silence) by A-Sun
 Liuyue De Yu (六月的雨; June Showers) by Hu Ge
 Hongse Pugongying (紅色蒲公英; Red Dandelion)
 Moshi Mowang (莫失莫忘; Do Not Lose, Do Not Forget)
 Rang Ai (讓愛; Give Up Love)
 Yi Mo Bei (尹莫悲; Do Not Grief)
 Wuhui Guangyin (無悔光陰; Life of No Regrets)
 Jixu Fenzhen (繼續奮戰; Fight On)

Limited edition bonus tracks
 Dadi Zhimu (大地之母; Mother Earth)
 Yao Yu (妖域; Realm of Demons)
 Taohua Dao (桃花島; Peach Blossom Island)
 Nüwa Zhihou (女媧之後; Descendant of Nüwa)
 Baiyue (拜月; Moon Worship)
 Xianjian Qiyuan (仙劍奇緣; Adventure of Fairy and Sword)
 Moshi Mowang (莫失莫忘; Do Not Lose, Do Not Forget)
 Qianli Yinyuan Yixian Qian (千里姻緣一線牽; Thousand Whispers)
 Kuaile Xiaoyao (快樂逍遙; Happy and Merry)
 Lianhua Chi (蓮花池; Lotus Pond)
 Renjian Jingling (人間精靈; Fairy in the Human World)
 Jiuzui Sanfen Xing (酒醉三分醒; Slightly Sober in a Drunken State)
 Mo Yu Dao (魔與道; Good and Evil)
 Tangxue De Xin (淌血的心; Bleeding Heart)
 Jiang Shi Gu'er (姜氏孤兒; Orphan of the Jiang family)
 Biyi Niao (比翼鳥; Birds Flying Wing to Wing)
 Shikong Zhilun (時空之鑰; Wheel of Time)
 Ai De Shijie (愛的世界; World of Love)

See also
 Xuan-Yuan Sword: Scar of Sky

References

External links
 
  Chinese Paladin on Sina.com
  Chinese Paladin official page on Chinese Entertainment Shanghai website

Xianxia television series
2005 Chinese television series debuts
Chinese Paladin (TV series)
Television series by Tangren Media
Chinese television shows based on video games
Demons in television
Television about magic
Television series set in the Tang dynasty
Mandarin-language television shows
Live action television shows based on video games
Nanzhao in fiction